Townwood may refer to:

 Townwood, Ohio, an unincorporated community in Putnam County
 Townwood, Virginia, an unincorporated community in Albemarle County